Babelomurex fax is a species of sea snail, a marine gastropod mollusc in the family Muricidae, the murex snails or rock snails.

Distribution
Found in the Gulf of Mexico.

References

fax
Gastropods described in 1971